Fahad Thani (born 1 December 1973) is a Qatari former football player and current manager of the Qatar olympic football team. Thani, coaching mainly youth teams, including the Qatar U–17, was named as the replacement for Paulo Autuori as head coach of the Qatar national team in January 2013.

Thani graduated from the University of Qatar in 1996 with a degree in athletic training and in 1999 achieved an AFC "C" Coaching License and later in 2005 earned an AFC "A" License.

Career

Playing career 
Starting his playing career in the youth teams of Al Ahli, Thani played as a right back. He broke into the first team in 1990 at the age of 17, at a time when Al Ahli was undergoing its best years with the likes of Adel Malallah and Issa Ahmed playing for the club. His most notable achievement with Al Ahli was when he won the Emir of Qatar Cup in 1992, defeating Al Rayyan in the 2nd leg after losing the 1st leg 2–1.

He also played for Qatar's national youth teams.

Managerial career 
Thani retired from football in 1993 and took up coaching. He first coached the youth teams of Al Rayyan and Al Ahli from 1994 to 1999, in addition to landing a job as the assistant coach of the Qatar U–17 team in 1995. He worked alongside future Manchester United coach René Meulensteen. After a two-year stint with the Qatar U–14 team, he was appointed head coach of the Qatar U–17 team in 2005. However, he failed to guide his team through the Asian qualifiers that year and also failed to make an impact in the 2006 Under 17 Gulf Cup of Nations.

After leaving his national team post, he was a part of ASPIRE Academy's coaching staff, managing the U–16 team. In 2011, he once again joined the Qatar U–17 team as an assistant coach during the 2011 Under 17 Gulf Cup of Nations. He was later appointed as the assistant coach of Qatar under Sebastião Lazaroni in August 2011. In January 2013, after a series of disappointing results and performances, namely a lackluster performance in the 2013 Gulf Cup of Nations, Paulo Autuori mutually terminated his contract with the QFA and Thani was chosen as the new head coach.

He adopted a different policy on player selection than his predecessors, with only 7 of the 26 players he called up for the 2015 AFC Asian Cup qualification being foreign-born. His managerial debut came against Lebanon, which Qatar emerged 1–0 winners of after dominating the game, and, consequently, missing a late penalty. A week later, on 6 February, Qatar played their first competitive match against Malaysia as part of the 2015 AFC Asian Cup qualification. They narrowly won the match 2–0.

Thani's first real test as manager of Qatar came against Egypt on 8 March 2013 in a match which was organized in preparation for a World Cup Qualifying match against South Korea. Previously, on 28 December 2012, Egypt had defeated Qatar 2–0, then under Paulo Autuori, in Doha. However, under Thani's command, the match ended in a 3–1 victory for Qatar in the same venue. Egypt were missing most of their key players and the match was not recorded in FIFA's official calendar.

His team's first competitive loss came against Bahrain on 18 March 2013 in an away match for the 2015 AFC Cup qualifiers. Qatar then lost 1–2 to South Korea in an away match on 26 March 2013 due to a goal in the last minute of injury time for the hosts.

Honors 
Al Ahli
Emir of Qatar Cup: 1992

References 

1973 births
Living people
Qatari footballers
Qatar international footballers
Al Ahli SC (Doha) players
Qatar national football team managers
Qatari football managers
Qatar University alumni
Aspire Academy managers
Qatar Stars League players
Association football fullbacks